Haubi is an administrative ward in the Kondoa district of the Dodoma Region of Tanzania. According to the 2002 census, the ward has a total population of 12,894.

There are no public water or electricity there. The lake Haubi has been investigated as a natural historical archive. It contains for instance sediments from the Haubi badlands = bad erosion.

Pictures can be found on Panoramio of Lake and Badlands.

References

Kondoa District
Wards of Dodoma Region